Cecil A. Beasley (1876–1959) was an American lawyer and politician.

Early life
Cecil A. Beasley was born on December 20, 1876, in Fayette, Alabama.

Beasley graduated from Alabama State Normal College in Florence, Alabama, in 1896. He graduated from the University of Alabama in Tuscaloosa in 1900. While in college, he joined Sigma Alpha Epsilon.

Career
Beasley was an attorney with the firm Beasley and Wright. He served as a member of the Alabama Senate. He was the assistant to John H. Bankhead.

Beasley was a member of the Royal Arch Masonry, the Knights of Pythias and the Odd Fellows.

Personal life
Beasley married Louise Robertson. They resided in Fayette, Alabama.

Death
Beasley died on September 23, 1959, in Washington, D.C. He was buried at the Rock Creek Cemetery.

References

External links

1876 births
People from Fayette, Alabama
University of North Alabama alumni
University of Alabama alumni
Alabama state senators
American Freemasons
1959 deaths
Burials at Rock Creek Cemetery